Khasali (also Romanized as Khāş‘alī; also known as Bāgh-e Bālā) is a village in Kuhdasht-e Shomali Rural District, in the Central District of Kuhdasht County, Lorestan Province, Iran. At the 2006 census, its population was 107, in 26 families.

References 

Towns and villages in Kuhdasht County